Fisher Farm Cemetery, including the B'nai Abraham Cemetery, the Hrabik Cemetery, the Beth Hamedrosh Hagadol Cemetery (also called Mt. Sinai Cemetery), and Bnai Abraham Cemetery, is located at 8600 South 42 Street in Bellevue, Nebraska.

History
Willard Fisher, an early Sarpy County farmer, buried his three children in the corner of his farm after an epidemic in 1883. His grave and those of his children were later joined by several Jewish congregations.

Fisher Farm Cemetery was established by the Congregation Share Zion in 1901. In 1909 the deed was later transferred to Chevra B'nai Yisroel. In 1915 the deed was transferred again to the B'nai Abrahm Society of South Omaha.  Eventually Hrabik, Beth Hamedrosh Hagadol and Bnai Abraham cemeteries would join Fisher Farm Cemetery.

The cemetery is still active, and is almost full.

Layout
The older section of the cemetery is segregated by gender and age. In one row adult males were buried side by side down the row in order of death. In the next row adult females were buried in the same fashion. There were separate rows where most of the children were buried. There is no way to establish who was a husband and wife since they were buried separately.

In the new sections couples and families are usually buried together. Another interesting feature is that most of the graves have raised concrete borders and the enclosed area contains ground cover. Most of the more recent markers have Hebrew and English inscriptions, but many of the oldest ones have only Hebrew inscriptions. Some have had English inscriptions added later to the original Hebrew ones.

See also
 List of cemeteries in Omaha
 History of Omaha

References

External links
 
 

Buildings and structures in Bellevue, Nebraska
Jewish cemeteries in Omaha, Nebraska
History of Sarpy County, Nebraska
Protected areas of Sarpy County, Nebraska
1901 establishments in Nebraska